Thebaud may refer to:

People with the surname
Augustus Thébaud (1807–1885), French-born American educator.
Edward Thebaud (1798—1884), American merchant.
Joseph Thebaud (1772–1811), American merchant.
Leo Hewlett Thebaud (1890–1980), American military personnel.
Léon Thébaud, French lawyer and ambassador.
Louis A. Thebaud, (1859–1939), American sportsman, businessman, and philanthropist.
Sacha Thébaud (1934–2004), Haitian artist.
Thomas Thebaud, Dean of Wells between 1381 and 1389.

Location
Château-Thébaud, a town in France.

Other
Gertrude L. Thebaud, American racing schooner.
Thebaud Brothers,  commission house in New York City, USA.
Thebaud, a natural gas field of the Sable Offshore Energy Project in Canada.